Mariya Koryttseva and Tatiana Poutchek won the title, beating Monica Niculescu and Galina Voskoboeva in the final, 6–3, 2–6, [10–8].

Seeds

Draw

Draw

References
 Main Draw

Baku Cup - Doubles
2011 Doubles